A satellite is said to occupy an inclined orbit around Earth if the orbit exhibits an angle other than 0° to the equatorial plane. This angle is called the orbit's inclination. A planet is said to have an inclined orbit around the Sun if it has an angle other than 0° to the ecliptic plane.

Types of inclined orbits

Geosynchronous orbits 

A geosynchronous orbit is an inclined orbit with an altitude of  that completes one revolution every sidereal day tracing out a small figure-eight shape in the sky. A geostationary orbit is a special case of geosynchronous orbit with no inclination, and therefore no apparent movement across the sky from a fixed observation point on the Earth's surface.

Due to their inherent instability, geostationary orbits will eventually become inclined if they are not corrected using thrusters. At the end of the satellite's lifetime, when fuel approaches depletion, satellite operators may decide to omit these expensive manoeuvres to correct inclination and only control eccentricity. This prolongs the life-time of the satellite as it consumes less fuel over time, but the satellite can then only be used by ground antennas capable of following the north–south movement, satellite-tracking Earth stations.

Polar orbits

A polar orbit has an inclination of 90 degrees passing over the poles of the planet on each pass. These types of orbits are often used for earth observation and weather services.

Sun-synchronous orbits

This is a special type of orbit that precesses at the same rate that the sun moves along the ecliptic, causing the satellite to rise over a fixed location on the earth's surface at the same mean solar time every day.

These orbits have an inclination governed by the equation:

See also
 List of orbits
 Orbital inclination
 Non-inclined orbit

External links

References

Orbits